F. Scott Fitzgerald (1896–1940) was an American author of novels and short stories.

Scott Fitzgerald may also refer to:
Scott L. Fitzgerald (born 1963), member of House of Representatives for the State of Wisconsin
Scott Fitzgerald (footballer, born 1969), former Wimbledon defender, former manager of Brentford
Scott Fitzgerald (footballer, born 1979), professional football player playing for Wealdstone F.C.
Scott Fitzgerald (singer), British singer 
Scott Fitzgerald (boxer), British boxer